Jerry Franklin "B. J." Young II (July 23, 1977 – November 30, 2005) was an American professional ice hockey right winger. He was drafted by the Detroit Red Wings in the sixth round, 157th overall, of the 1997 NHL Entry Draft. He played one game in the National Hockey League with Red Wings.

Young played junior hockey with the Tri-City Americans and Red Deer Rebels of the Western Hockey League (WHL). While with Red Deer he led the WHL in goal scoring during the 1996–97 season and was named to the WHL East First All-Star Team. Young spent the majority of his career in the minor leagues playing for the Adirondack Red Wings and Cincinnati Mighty Ducks of the American Hockey League, the Manitoba Moose of the International Hockey League, and the Anchorage/Alaska Aces in both the West Coast Hockey League and ECHL. Born in Anchorage, Alaska Young represented the United States at the 1997 World Junior Championships, winning a silver medal.

Career

Amateur 
Young began playing hockey at age four, and by age eight, he was playing travel ice hockey. He began his junior career with the Tri-City Americans of the Western Hockey League (WHL). In his first season with the Americans Young scored 19 goals and 43 points in 54 games, adding another goal and two points in two playoff games. During the 1994–95 season, his second, with Tri-City Young was traded to the Red Deer Rebels. Though he only scored 23 points in 51 games between the two teams, Americans' general manager Dennis Beyak stated it was a deal that could come back to haunt them. In his first full season with Red Deer Young had a breakout season scoring 49 goals and 94 points. He followed up by scoring 58 goals and 114 points in 63 games during the 1996–97 season. The goal total led the WHL and he was named to the WHL East First All-Star Team. In the off-season Young was drafted by the National Hockey League's (NHL) Detroit Red Wings in the sixth round, 157th overall, of the 1997 NHL Entry Draft.

Professional 
After being drafted Young signed three-year two-way contract with the Red Wings. He played in six preseason games for the Red Wings, but with Detroit being the defending Stanley Cup champions he was unable to make the team out of camp. He began his professional career with Detroit's American Hockey League affiliate, the Adirondack Red Wings. Young played two seasons in Adirondack scoring 67 points in 123 games. In his third professional season Young joined the Cincinnati Mighty Ducks who he led in goals with 25. He also made his NHL debut during the season playing one game for the Red Wings. He played two shifts in the game without registering a point. It was the only NHL game of his career.

In the off-season Young re-signed with Detroit. He returned to Cincinnati but after 42 games Detroit moved Young to the Manitoba Moose in the International Hockey League (IHL). Young finished the year scoring 22 goals and 51 points in 75 games between the two teams. The following season he signed with his hometown Anchorage Aces in the West Coast Hockey League (WCHL). He was named team captain for the 2002–03 season. After which he took a year off from hockey for personal and family matters. Prior to the 2004–05 season he was given a tryout to return to the Aces, now called the Alaska Aces playing in the ECHL. He made the team due in part to making an impression on the coaching staff after not quitting on a difficult conditioning skate. He recorded 13 goals and 35 points in 48 games in his final professional season.

International 

Young represented the United States at the 1997 World Junior Championships in Geneva, Switzerland. Young scored two goals and four points in six games helping the US win the silver medal.

Death 
Young was killed in a single-car accident in Vancouver, British Columbia on November 30, 2005, when the car he was driving veered off the road, struck a tree and hit a light pole.

Career statistics

Regular season and playoffs

International

Awards
Western Hockey League East First All-Star Team - 1997

See also
List of Detroit Red Wings draft picks
List of players who played only one game in the NHL

References

External links

1977 births
2005 deaths
Accidental deaths in British Columbia
Adirondack Red Wings players
Alaska Aces (ECHL) players
American men's ice hockey right wingers
Anchorage Aces players
Cincinnati Mighty Ducks players
Detroit Red Wings draft picks
Detroit Red Wings players
Ice hockey people from Anchorage, Alaska
Manitoba Moose (IHL) players
Red Deer Rebels players
Road incident deaths in Canada
Tri-City Americans players